Bystřice may refer to places in the Czech Republic:

Inhabited places
Bystřice (Benešov District), a town in the Central Bohemian Region
Bystřice (Frýdek-Místek District), a municipality and village in the Moravian-Silesian Region
Bystřice (Jičín District), a municipality and village in the Hradec Králové Region
Bystřice, a village and part of Bělá nad Radbuzou in the Plzeň Region
Bystřice, a village and part of Dubí in the Ústí nad Labem Region
Bystřice, a village and part of Hroznětín in the Karlovy Vary Region
Bystřice, a village and part of Včelákov in the Pardubice Region
Bystřice nad Pernštejnem, a town in the Vysočina Region
Bystřice nad Úhlavou, a village and part of Nýrsko in the Plzeň Region
Bystřice pod Hostýnem, a town in the Zlín Region
Bystřice pod Lopeníkem, a municipality and village in the Zlín Region
Malá Bystřice, a municipality and village in the Zlín Region
Nová Bystřice, a town in the South Bohemian Region
Valašská Bystřice, a municipality and village in the Zlín Region 
Velká Bystřice, a town in the Olomouc Region

Rivers
Bystřice (river), a tributary of the Cidlina in the Hradec Králové Region

See also
Bystrica (disambiguation)
Bystrzyca (disambiguation)
Bistrica (disambiguation)
Bistritz (disambiguation)